The Pittsburgh Penguins were the best team in the NHL during the 1992–93 regular season. Their 56 wins and 119 points earned them the Presidents' Trophy's as the League's top team. Four players reached the 100-point plateau and, for the second consecutive season, five reached the 30-goal plateau. Despite missing over a quarter of the regular season due to Hodgkin's Disease, Mario Lemieux returned later in the year to help the Penguins put together a 17-game winning streak, an NHL record still standing today.

Logo

The Penguins began a process of rebranding the team under previous owner Edward J. DeBartolo, Sr., culminating in a new logo and uniforms for the 1992–93 season. The Pittsburgh design firm Vance Wright Adams was hired to create the new look, and went through many design variations which included options of changing the Penguins' shade of gold to a metallic gold, a color that would eventually be adopted by the team as Vegas gold in 2000.

The final logo featured the bust of a left-facing penguin, drawn in a stylized but more realistic style compared to the cartoony skating penguin of the previous logo. The penguin's wing is stylized into the shape of a striped triangle, and the body and wing are part of a triangle that is completed by a Pittsburgh gold field to the left of the chest, tying the new logo back to the original and its reference to Pittsburgh's Golden Triangle. Fans would come to refer to the new logo as either the "robo-penguin" (or "robopen" for short) or the "pigeon".

The new uniform designs came down to two sets of finalists - one set featuring the new logo on the front, with pointed yellow shoulders, and the other featuring the logo on the shoulders and diagonal text across the front, recalling the "PITTSBURGH" that appeared across the Penguins' inaugural uniforms, with "PENGUINS" on the white home jersey and "PITTSBURGH" on the black road jersey. The waist and sleeve striping would end up being identical on the final versions of both sets, with the black jerseys' waist stripes being identical to the outgoing jersey's design of a thick white stripe over a thick gold stripe with a thin black stripe in between; the white jerseys featured matching stripes that reversed the black and white stripes. The sleeve stripes were arranged diagonally, pointing downward from the sleeve numbers to the cuff. 

The Penguins sought permission to use both sets of jerseys, but were denied by the NHL, so the team opted to split the difference, adopting the white home jersey featuring the logo on front and the black road jersey featuring the diagonal "PITTSBURGH" text. Three decades later, when Adidas and the NHL introduced the Reverse Retro jersey program, the Penguins' retro jerseys would recall the unused prototypes from this redesign, with their 2020–21 uniforms resembling the unused white jersey with some changes, while the 2022–23 uniforms being a straight recreation of the unused black jersey, adapted to the Adizero jersey template.

Regular season
Pittsburgh allowed the most short-handed goals (19) during the regular season of all 24 teams. In addition to tying the Buffalo Sabres for most hat-tricks during the regular season, with ten, the Penguins finished second in shooting percentage, scoring 367 goals on 2,725 shots (13.5%). The Penguins also achieved a feat of 3 goals in 29 seconds during a home game on January 26, 1993.

Mario Lemieux
It was announced during the regular season that Mario Lemieux had been diagnosed with Hodgkin's Disease. Despite missing 24 regular season games and the 1993 NHL All-Star Game in Montreal on February 6, 1993, Lemieux led the League in plus-minus with +55 and led in scoring with 160 points (a total for which he would win the Art Ross Trophy). At the pace he was scoring goals (1.15 per game) and earning up assists (1.52 per game), he could have scored 97 goals and tallied 128 assists for 225 points had he played all 84 games. Had he achieved these totals, he would have broken Wayne Gretzky's all-time records for most goals in a season (92) and most points in a season (215). In recognition of his dedication and his achievements, Lemieux was awarded the Hart Memorial Trophy as the NHL's MVP during the regular season.

Season standings

Schedule and results

|-  style="background:#ffc;"
| 1 || 6 || Philadelphia Flyers || 3–3 OT || Pittsburgh Penguins || 0–0–1 || 1
|-  style="background:#cfc;"
| 2 || 8 || New York Islanders || 3–7 || Pittsburgh Penguins || 1–0–1 || 3
|-  style="background:#ffc;"
| 3 || 10 || Pittsburgh Penguins || 3–3 OT || Montreal Canadiens || 1–0–2 || 4
|-  style="background:#cfc;"
| 4 || 13 || Buffalo Sabres || 5–6 || Pittsburgh Penguins || 2–0–2 || 6
|-  style="background:#cfc;"
| 5 || 15 || Montreal Canadiens || 2–5 || Pittsburgh Penguins || 3–0–2 || 8
|-  style="background:#cfc;"
| 6 || 17 || Pittsburgh Penguins || 7–3 || Hartford Whalers || 4–0–2 || 10
|-  style="background:#cfc;"
| 7 || 20 || Vancouver Canucks || 1–5 || Pittsburgh Penguins || 5–0–2 || 12
|-  style="background:#cfc;"
| 8 || 22 || Detroit Red Wings || 6–9 || Pittsburgh Penguins || 6–0–2 || 14
|-  style="background:#cfc;"
| 9 || 24 || Pittsburgh Penguins || 4–3 || New Jersey Devils || 7–0–2 || 16
|-  style="background:#cfc;"
| 10 || 27 || Pittsburgh Penguins || 7–2 || Ottawa Senators || 8–0–2 || 18
|-  style="background:#fcf;"
| 11 || 29 || Pittsburgh Penguins || 4–6 || St. Louis Blues || 8–1–2 || 18
|-

|-  style="background:#cfc;"
| 12 || 1 || Pittsburgh Penguins || 5–4 || Tampa Bay Lightning || 9–1–2 || 20
|-  style="background:#cfc;"
| 13 || 3 || New York Islanders || 0–2 || Pittsburgh Penguins || 10–1–2 || 22
|-  style="background:#cfc;"
| 14 || 5 || St. Louis Blues || 4–8 || Pittsburgh Penguins || 11–1–2 || 24
|-  style="background:#fcf;"
| 15 || 7 || Pittsburgh Penguins || 2–4 || Toronto Maple Leafs || 11–2–2 || 24
|-  style="background:#fcf;"
| 16 || 8 || Pittsburgh Penguins || 2–7 || Chicago Blackhawks || 11–3–2 || 24
|-  style="background:#cfc;"
| 17 || 10 || Pittsburgh Penguins || 4–1 || Minnesota North Stars || 12–3–2 || 26
|-  style="background:#ffc;"
| 18 || 12 || Quebec Nordiques || 4–4 OT || Pittsburgh Penguins || 12–3–3 || 27
|-  style="background:#fcf;"
| 19 || 13 || Pittsburgh Penguins || 0–8 || Detroit Red Wings || 12–4–3 || 27
|-  style="background:#cfc;"
| 20 || 17 || Buffalo Sabres || 2–4 || Pittsburgh Penguins || 13–4–3 || 29
|-  style="background:#cfc;"
| 21 || 20 || Pittsburgh Penguins || 4–1 || New Jersey Devils || 14–4–3 || 31
|-  style="background:#cfc;"
| 22 || 21 || New Jersey Devils || 0–2 || Pittsburgh Penguins || 15–4–3 || 33
|-  style="background:#cfc;"
| 23 || 23 || Pittsburgh Penguins || 5–2 || New York Rangers || 16–4–3 || 35
|-  style="background:#fcf;"
| 24 || 25 || New York Rangers || 11–3 || Pittsburgh Penguins || 16–5–3 || 35
|-  style="background:#fcf;"
| 25 || 27 || Pittsburgh Penguins || 4–6 || Washington Capitals || 16–6–3 || 35
|-  style="background:#cfc;"
| 26 || 28 || Washington Capitals || 3–5 || Pittsburgh Penguins || 17–6–3 || 37
|-

|-  style="background:#cfc;"
| 27 || 1 || Pittsburgh Penguins || 7–3 || New York Islanders || 18–6–3 || 39
|-  style="background:#fcf;"
| 28 || 3 || Pittsburgh Penguins || 3–5 || Los Angeles Kings || 18–7–3 || 39
|-  style="background:#cfc;"
| 29 || 5 || Pittsburgh Penguins || 9–4 || San Jose Sharks || 19–7–3 || 41
|-  style="background:#cfc;"
| 30 || 8 || Winnipeg Jets || 2–5 || Pittsburgh Penguins || 20–7–3 || 43
|-  style="background:#fcf;"
| 31 || 11 || Pittsburgh Penguins || 1–2 || New Jersey Devils || 20–8–3 || 43
|-  style="background:#cfc;"
| 32 || 12 || New Jersey Devils || 5–6 || Pittsburgh Penguins || 21–8–3 || 45
|-  style="background:#cfc;"
| 33 || 15 || Philadelphia Flyers || 2–6 || Pittsburgh Penguins || 22–8–3 || 47
|-  style="background:#cfc;"
| 34 || 17 || Pittsburgh Penguins || 5–4 OT || Philadelphia Flyers || 23–8–3 || 49
|-  style="background:#fcf;"
| 35 || 19 || New York Islanders || 4–3 || Pittsburgh Penguins || 23–9–3 || 49
|-  style="background:#cfc;"
| 36 || 21 || Quebec Nordiques || 4–7 || Pittsburgh Penguins || 24–9–3 || 51
|-  style="background:#cfc;"
| 37 || 23 || Pittsburgh Penguins || 4–0 || Philadelphia Flyers || 25–9–3 || 53
|-  style="background:#cfc;"
| 38 || 27 || Pittsburgh Penguins || 4–2 || Buffalo Sabres || 26–9–3 || 55
|-  style="background:#ffc;"
| 39 || 31 || Toronto Maple Leafs || 3–3 OT || Pittsburgh Penguins || 26–9–4 || 56
|-

|-  style="background:#cfc;"
| 40 || 2 || New York Rangers || 2–5 || Pittsburgh Penguins || 27–9–4 || 58
|-  style="background:#cfc;"
| 41 || 5 || Boston Bruins || 2–6 || Pittsburgh Penguins || 28–9–4 || 60
|-  style="background:#fcf;"
| 42 || 7 || Minnesota North Stars || 6–3 || Pittsburgh Penguins || 28–10–4 || 60
|-  style="background:#cfc;"
| 43 || 9 || Calgary Flames || 2–3 || Pittsburgh Penguins || 29–10–4 || 62
|-  style="background:#fcf;"
| 44 || 10 || Pittsburgh Penguins || 2–3 || Winnipeg Jets || 29–11–4 || 62
|-  style="background:#fcf;"
| 45 || 14 || Pittsburgh Penguins || 0–7 || Boston Bruins || 29–12–4 || 62
|-  style="background:#cfc;"
| 46 || 16 || Ottawa Senators || 1–6 || Pittsburgh Penguins || 30–12–4 || 64
|-  style="background:#cfc;"
| 47 || 19 || Pittsburgh Penguins || 5–2 || Vancouver Canucks || 31–12–4 || 66
|-  style="background:#fcf;"
| 48 || 22 || Pittsburgh Penguins || 1–2 || Edmonton Oilers || 31–13–4 || 66
|-  style="background:#cfc;"
| 49 || 23 || Pittsburgh Penguins || 4–3 || Calgary Flames || 32–13–4 || 68
|-  style="background:#cfc;"
| 50 || 26 || Washington Capitals || 3–6 || Pittsburgh Penguins || 33–13–4 || 70
|-  style="background:#fcf;"
| 51 || 28 || New York Islanders || 5–2 || Pittsburgh Penguins || 33–14–4 || 70
|-  style="background:#cfc;"
| 52 || 30 || Philadelphia Flyers || 2–4 || Pittsburgh Penguins || 34–14–4 || 72
|-  style="background:#ffc;"
| 53 || 31 || Pittsburgh Penguins || 2–2 OT || Washington Capitals || 34–14–5 || 73
|-

|-  style="background:#cfc;"
| 54 || 8 || Boston Bruins || 0–4 || Pittsburgh Penguins || 35–14–5 || 75
|-  style="background:#cfc;"
| 55 || 10 || Pittsburgh Penguins || 3–0 || New York Rangers || 36–14–5 || 77
|-  style="background:#cfc;"
| 56 || 13 || Chicago Blackhawks || 1–4 || Pittsburgh Penguins || 37–14–5 || 79
|-  style="background:#fcf;"
| 57 || 14 || Pittsburgh Penguins || 4–7 || Buffalo Sabres || 37–15–5 || 79
|-  style="background:#fcf;"
| 58 || 18 || Edmonton Oilers || 5–4 || Pittsburgh Penguins || 37–16–5 || 79
|-  style="background:#fcf;"
| 59 || 20 || Pittsburgh Penguins || 2–4 || New York Islanders || 37–17–5 || 79
|-  style="background:#cfc;"
| 60 || 21 || Pittsburgh Penguins || 4–3 || Hartford Whalers || 38–17–5 || 81
|-  style="background:#fcf;"
| 61 || 23 || New Jersey Devils || 3–1 || Pittsburgh Penguins || 38–18–5 || 81
|-  style="background:#fcf;"
| 62 || 25 || Pittsburgh Penguins || 1–2 || Ottawa Senators || 38–19–5 || 81
|-  style="background:#ffc;"
| 63 || 27 || Tampa Bay Lightning || 3–3 OT || Pittsburgh Penguins || 38–19–6 || 82
|-  style="background:#cfc;"
| 64 || 28 || Pittsburgh Penguins || 4–2 || Washington Capitals || 39–19–6 || 84
|-

|-  style="background:#fcf;"
| 65 || 02 || Pittsburgh Penguins || 4–5 || Philadelphia Flyers || 39–20–6 || 84
|-  style="background:#fcf;"
| 66 || 05 || Pittsburgh Penguins || 1–3 || New York Rangers || 39–21–6 || 84
|-  style="background:#cfc;"
| 67 || 09 || Boston Bruins || 2–3 || Pittsburgh Penguins || 40–21–6 || 86
|-  style="background:#cfc;"
| 68 || 11 || Los Angeles Kings || 3–4 OT || Pittsburgh Penguins || 41–21–6 || 88
|-  style="background:#cfc;"
| 69 || 14 || Pittsburgh Penguins || 3–2 || New York Islanders || 42–21–6 || 90
|-  style="background:#cfc;"
| 70 || 18 || Washington Capitals || 5–7 || Pittsburgh Penguins || 43–21–6 || 92
|-  style="background:#cfc;"
| 71 || 20 || Philadelphia Flyers || 3–9 || Pittsburgh Penguins || 44–21–6 || 94
|-  style="background:#cfc;"
| 72 || 21 || Pittsburgh Penguins || 6–4 || Edmonton Oilers || 45–21–6 || 96
|-  style="background:#cfc;"
| 73 || 23 || San Jose Sharks || 2–7 || Pittsburgh Penguins || 46–21–6 || 98
|-  style="background:#cfc;"
| 74 || 25 || New Jersey Devils || 3–4 || Pittsburgh Penguins || 47–21–6 || 100
|-  style="background:#cfc;"
| 75 || 27 || Pittsburgh Penguins || 5–3 || Boston Bruins || 48–21–6 || 102
|-  style="background:#cfc;"
| 76 || 28 || Pittsburgh Penguins || 4–1 || Washington Capitals || 49–21–6 || 104
|-  style="background:#cfc;"
| 77 || 30 || Ottawa Senators || 4–6 || Pittsburgh Penguins || 50–21–6 || 106
|-

|-  style="background:#cfc;"
| 78 || 1 || Hartford Whalers || 2–10 || Pittsburgh Penguins || 51–21–6 || 108
|-  style="background:#cfc;"
| 79 || 3 || Pittsburgh Penguins || 5–3 || Quebec Nordiques || 52–21–6 || 110
|-  style="background:#cfc;"
| 80 || 4 || Pittsburgh Penguins || 5–2 || New Jersey Devils || 53–21–6 || 112
|-  style="background:#cfc;"
| 81 || 7 || Montreal Canadiens || 3–4 OT || Pittsburgh Penguins || 54–21–6 || 114
|-  style="background:#cfc;"
| 82 || 9 || Pittsburgh Penguins || 10–4 || New York Rangers || 55–21–6 || 116
|-  style="background:#cfc;"
| 83 || Apr 10 || New York Rangers || 2–4 || Pittsburgh Penguins || 56–21–6 || 118
|-  style="background:#ffc;"
| 84 || Apr 14 || Pittsburgh Penguins || 6–6 OT || New Jersey Devils || 56–21–7 || 119
|-

|- style="text-align:center;"
| Legend:       = Win       = Loss       = Tie

Playoffs

Patrick Division Semifinals

Pittsburgh vs. New Jersey

The Devils had been a struggling team prior to the 1992–93 season, and in the first round of the playoffs, they met the Presidents' Trophy winners from Pittsburgh. The Penguins entered the series on an 11-game playoff winning streak, which they extended to a record 14 games in this series.

Patrick Division Finals

Pittsburgh vs. New York Islanders
The Isles' improbable upset of the Penguins was capped off by David Volek's series-winning goal at 5:16 of overtime in Game 7.

Player statistics
Skaters

Goaltenders

†Denotes player spent time with another team before joining the Penguins.  Stats reflect time with the Penguins only.
‡Denotes player was traded mid-season.  Stats reflect time with the Penguins only.

Awards and records
 Mario Lemieux became the first person to score 1100 points for the Penguins. He did so in a 5–4 win over Philadelphia on December 17.
 Troy Loney set a franchise record for penalty minutes (980). He broke the previous high of 959 set by Rod Buskas is 1990.

Awards

Transactions
The Penguins were involved in the following transactions during the 1992–93 season:

Trades

Free agents

Waivers

Signings

Other

Draft picks

Pittsburgh Penguins' picks at the 1992 NHL Entry Draft.

Draft notes
 The Pittsburgh Penguins' 11th-round pick went to the St. Louis Blues as the result of an October 2, 1990, trade that sent Gordie Roberts to the Penguins in exchange for this pick.

Farm teams
The Cleveland Lumberjacks relocated from Muskegon for the 1992–93 season. They finished second in the International Hockey League (IHL)'s Atlantic Division which earned them a playoff spot. They lost in the first round of the playoffs to the eventual Turner Cup champion Fort Wayne Komets.

References
 Penguins on Hockey Database

Presidents' Trophy seasons
Pittsburgh Penguins seasons
Pitts
Pitts
Patrick Division champion seasons
Pitts
Pitts